Reef points may refer to:
The midshipman handbook of the United States Naval Academy
A strap used to secure a sail